Undomesticated cat may refer to:

Feral cat, an originally domesticated cat that was abandoned or born in the wild
Big cat, a term used informally to distinguish the larger felid species from smaller ones
Wildcat (Felis silvestris), a small cat native to most of Africa, Europe, and Southwest and Central Asia into India, western China, and Mongolia